The Ministry of Finance of Azerbaijan Republic is a governmental agency within the Cabinet of Azerbaijan in charge of regulating the financial sector in Azerbaijan Republic. The ministry is headed by Samir Sharifov.

History
The office of Minister of Finance was established on May 18, 1918, when Azerbaijan Democratic Republic declared independence. The Minister of Finance was one of members of the first cabinet. The Ministry of Finance itself, however, was formally established on October 21, 1918. With incorporation of Azerbaijan into USSR, the Ministry of Finance was subdued to Soviet Ministry of Finances. On August 4, 1956, and October 29, 1971, the statute of the ministry was revised by Council of Ministers decrees No. 385 and No. 358, respectively. The main functions of the ministry were collection of financial means to be distributed within the economic sector of Azerbaijan SSR. The current activity of the Ministry of Finance is regulated by the Statute about the Ministry of Finance of the Republic of Azerbaijan approved by Presidential Decree No. 271 on February 4, 2000.

Structure
The Ministry of Finance is the central executive power body within the borders of the Republic of Azerbaijan which implements the financial policy of the state and arranges the controlling of state finance. According to Decree 48 of February 9, 2009 of the President of the Republic of Azerbaijan, the ministry carrying out its duties. Ministry's apparatus, State Financial Control Service, Public Debt Management Agency, State Insurance Control Service, State Treasury Agency, State Service controlling Precious Metals and Stones, local agencies and other subordinate departments of the Ministry and the corresponding institution of the Autonomous Republic of Nakhchivan constitute the system the Ministry of Finance. Based on  Decision 55 of April 6, 2010 of the Cabinet of Ministers of the Republic of Azerbaijan, the ministry does not involve Data Centre and ‘Finance and Accounting Magazine Editorial Office’ LLC, Financial Science and Education Center which are considered as the dependent bodies of the Ministry of Finance. The ministry is headed by the minister and two deputy ministers. Functions of the ministry are improvement of state policies on finance, budgeting and taxes; ensuring stability of state finances and development of financial markets in the country; attracting foreign creditors to Azerbaijani economy; improvement of budgeting, tax forecasting, financial mechanisms; ensuring financial control over budgetary funds and spending; provision of state budget funds management and controlling movement of funds within Azerbaijan.

Duties of Ministry 
The Ministry of Finance of the Republic of Azerbaijan implementing the duties mentioned below;

 Recommending on management of united finance, budget, and taxes policy of the government and implementation of it; 
 Establishment and arrangement of the project of state budget; 
 Making state finance more stable and taking required actions in order to develop financial market; 
 Attracting foreign credit to the economy of the Republic Azerbaijan, recommending on the implementation of the accounting of their spending and payments; 
 Improving budgetary system, budget-taxes prognosis, financing mechanisms, and accounting and reporting regulations; 
 Ensuring financial control on spending of budgetary funds, targeted budget funds, funds of budgetary entities (outside the budget), including internal and external loans taken under governmental guarantee; 
 Making state budget management more productive and providing its appropriate allocation; 
 Carrying of standards supervision within the territory of the Republic of Azerbaijan.

Rights of Ministry 

 Receive and compile analytical materials and calculations on structural units, municipalities and extra budgetary funds, regardless of ownership or legal form, necessary for the preparation of the draft budget;
 Receive reports on functional, economic and administrative classifications in the manner established by organizations receiving subsidies and other financial assistance from budget organizations and the state budget;
 Restriction and reimbursement of funds already paid to the state budget in accordance with the law in case of unreasonableness of expenditures of funds allocated from the state budget (excluding defense expenditures), late submission of reports by notifying the heads of relevant executive authorities
 To take measures to withdraw from enterprises, institutions, organizations and municipalities funds allocated from the state budget, including funds allocated from the target budget in the manner prescribed by law;
 To exercise financial control over institutions, enterprises and organizations that use state budget funds;
 On the basis of legislation it has enforcement and judicial authorities to conduct inspections in institutions, enterprises and organizations
 To conduct an analysis of the financial and economic activities of state enterprises, institutions and organizations;
 Monitoring the organizations that are licensed by the Ministry of Finance;
 Monitoring institutions, enterprises and organizations involved in the processing of precious metals and precious stones;
 According to the law and within its authority to issue binding orders and orders.

Organization of the Ministry's activities 

 The Ministry is led by the Minister who is assigned and dismissed by the president of Azerbaijan Republic in accordance with Constitution of the country. 
 The Minister is held personally responsible for the implementation of the duties that has been considered for the Ministry. 
 The deputies of the minister (1st deputy and total of three deputies) is assigned and dismissed by the President of the Republic of Azerbaijan. They carry out duties assigned by the minister and are considered directly responsible.
 The Ministry has the Board (approved by the Cabinet of Ministers) consisting of minister (the head of the Board), his deputies based on their assignment and other important employees (total of nine members).
 The Board of the Ministry discusses issues related to the Ministry's activity at its meetings and makes relevant decisions on them;
 The decisions of the Board of the Ministry is formalized by the protocol and usually is executed by the orders of the Minister;

The Minister of Finance has the following authorities 

 Recommending on the authority of Ministry by representing it to the President of the Republic of Azerbaijan and the Cabinet of Ministers;  
 Allocating tasks among the deputies of the minister and determines the duties of other officials in the ministry by coordinating their activities;  
 Recruiting and firing employees of the apparatus of Ministry including heads of other entities and organizations operates under the Ministry;  
 Represent the Ministry in relations with the state authorities, management, enterprises and organizations of the Republic of Azerbaijan and foreign countries, negotiate and sign relevant agreements, agreements and protocols within the scope of their authority;
 Within its authority, undertakes the anti-corruption measures;

Subordinate bodies 

 Financial Science and Training Center
 Data processing center
 Baku Congress Center
 "Finance and Accounting" magazine edition

International relations 
The ministry has developed relationships with international and regional financial and credit organizations, including the International Monetary Fund (IMF), World Bank Group, European Bank for Reconstruction and Development (EBRD), Asian Development Bank (ADB) and Black Sea Trade and Development Bank (BSTDB) since its establishment. Later it started to cooperate with international financial institutions such as the Economic Cooperation Organization Trade and Development Bank (ETDB) and the Asian Infrastructure Investment Bank (AIIB).

List of Ministers

Finance Ministers of Azerbaijan Democratic Republic 
 Nasib Yusifbeyli, May 1918 – June 1918
 Abdulali bey Amirjanov, June 1918 – October 1918 
 Mammad Hasan Hajinski, October 1918 – December 1918 
 Ivan Protasov, December 1918 – March 1919  
 Aliagha Hasanov, March 1919 – December 1919
 Rashid Khan Kaplanov, 1919 – 1920

Finance Ministers of Azerbaijan SSR 
 N. Tagiyev, 1920 – 1922 
 Mirzabekyan, 1923 – 1924    
 Mirza Davud Huseynov, 1925 – 1925 
 A. Ibrahimov, 1926 – 1926
 T. Aliyev, 1927 – 1930   
 A. Mammadov, 1931 – 1931 
 N. Ibrahimov, 1932 – 1934 
 Atakishiyev, 1935 – 1935 
 N. Tagiyev, 1936 – 1937  
 Mirabutalib Samadov, 1938 – 1949 
 Rza Sadikhov, 1950 – 1957 
 Gurban Khalilov, 1958 – 1969 
 Bakhshali Bakhshaliyev, 1970 – 1987 
 Bedir Garayev, 1987 – 1991

Finance Ministers of Azerbaijan Republic 
 Bedir Garayev, 1991 – 1992
 Saleh Mammadov, 1992 – 1993 
 Fikrat Yusifov, 1994 – July 11, 1999 
 Avaz Alakbarov, July 11, 1999 – April 18, 2006 
 Samir Sharifov, April 18, 2006 – Incumbent

Minister Sharifov Corruption Allegations
Several news articles have discussed a correlation between Minister Sharifov's position in government and corruption:

Intelligence agent allegations

Sharifov served as a human asset (agent) for Russian, Turkish, and American intelligence services, according to information leaked by sources inside the Russian intelligence community that was published in the Ukrainian newspaper Gordonua on March 9, 2016.

Turkish intelligence officers first recruited Sharifov between 1989 and 1990. At some point shortly after 1990, the CIA recruited him.

Sharifov studied at the Kiev Shevchenko State University. While a student, the KGB recruited him with leverage. The KGB caught Sharifov illegally buying and selling foreign currency on the black market. In lieu of prosecution, the KGB got Sharifov to work for them. After Sharifov graduated, he worked for Azerbaijan's Ministry of Foreign Trade in South Yemen. He worked in a unit responsible for transporting Soviet military weapons and equipment to South Yemen. While working at that position, he secretly served as a human asset of the KGB's First Chief Directorate.

In 1990, two shipments of weapons going from the Soviet Union to South Yemen disappeared. The KGB investigated. Their investigation concluded that “ a “hostile foreign intelligence agency” had learned about the transports from a “mole” recruited among the Soviet employees in South Yemen who had knowledge about the transports.” The KGB found evidence that Sharifov had made been making contact with Turkish intelligence officers while working for the KGB at the South Yemen station.

The Soviet government removed Sharifov from his position and flew him to Moscow for interrogation. The Soviet Union collapsed shortly thereafter, Sharifov moved on to a new job.

State Oil Fund of Azerbaijan (SOFA)
In July 2004, APS Review Downstream Trends reported: “The transparency of the State Oil Fund of Azerbaijan (SOFA), which is headed by Samir Sharifov who is among key figures surrounding the new leader in Baku . . . Corruption remains widespread.”

New Petroleum Wealth
In 2005, Nefte Compass reported: “Fresh from elections that have been judged as less than perfect, Azerbaijan is getting on with the business of raking in the oil money, bracing itself for a flood of "petrodollars" that at current prices could exceed $150 billion over the next 20 years. Concerns abound that the windfall will be squandered through corruption rather than pumped into alleviating poverty. . . the fund's chairman [is] Samir Sharifov . . .”

Systemic Corruption
In 2002, APS Review Gas Market Trends reported: “There is a big question mark about Azerbaijan's future . . . Petroleum wealth without governmental accountability in the coming years will lead to more corruption and a population impoverished further. . . In October 1997 the British Ambassador, Roger Thomas, told a conference organised by the Baku chamber of commerce that corruption in Azerbaijan was getting out of hand. He spoke of "the hijacking of assets and wealth by a few people while a large part of the country goes empty-handed". He said foreign companies were being "frightened away" from Azerbaijan by excessive and arbitrary taxation. He said corruption, in the form of "unofficial overheads", provided "a further disincentive to invest". . . The fund's board of directors [is] led by Aliyev-appointed banker Samir Sharifov . . .”

Minister Sharifov Controversies
Article pages on CBS News and Foreign Policy Journal include the following information about Minister Sharifov:
 "The United States is encouraging Aliyev to appoint Samir Sharifov to be ... as a governor for Azerbaijan, clearly indicate a pattern of corruption."
 "There have been whispers of treason, bribery, and corruption under Minister of Finance, Samir Sharifov, but to move into terrorism is disgusting."

See also
Cabinet of Azerbaijan
Economy of Azerbaijan

References

Economy of Azerbaijan
Banking in Azerbaijan
Finance
Azerbaijan
Azerbaijan, Finance

ru:Министр финансов Азербайджана